Sir Marrack Goulding KCMG (2 September 19369 July 2010) was a British diplomat who served more than eleven years as Under-Secretary-General of the United Nations.

Early life 
Born in Plymouth in Devon, England, to Sir Irvine Goulding, a High Court judge. Goulding attended St Paul's School in London and later studied Literae Humaniores at Magdalen College, Oxford.

Career

HM Diplomatic Service 
Goulding entered HM Diplomatic Service in 1959 and was, in 1961, posted to the British Embassy in Kuwait. He returned to the United Kingdom in 1964, where he worked in the Foreign and Commonwealth Office. In 1968, he was once more posted overseas, as the Head of Chancery of the British Embassy in Tripoli, Libya, and later of the Embassy in Cairo, Egypt.

Goulding spent the following few years in the UK, working first in the Foreign Office as Private Secretary to three Ministers of State for Foreign and Commonwealth Affairs – including Roy Hattersley and Julian Amery, Baron Amery of Lustleigh – and then in the Cabinet Office. He was posted to the British Embassy in Lisbon, Portugal, in 1977, and to the United Kingdom Mission to the United Nations in New York City in 1979. In 1983, he was appointed Ambassador for the United Kingdom to Angola and São Tomé and Príncipe, and served in this capacity until 1985.

United Nations 
On 1 January 1986, Goulding became Under-Secretary-General (USG) of the United Nations for Special Political Affairs,
serving under Secretary-General Javier Pérez de Cuéllar. From then until March 1993, he headed peacekeeping operations for the UN,
and presided over the creation of the Department of Peacekeeping Operations in 1992, during the term of Secretary-General Boutros Boutros-Ghali.
According to Simon Chesterman of the New York University School of Law, the period of Goulding's service as head of UN peacekeeping – which saw the initiation of sixteen new missions – "may come to be regarded as its heyday".

In March 1993, Goulding became USG for Political Affairs. During his tenure at the UN, which ended in July 1997 during the first term of Secretary-General Kofi Annan, he was "effectively the second most powerful man in the UN".

St Antony's College, Oxford 
Goulding became Warden of St Antony's College at the University of Oxford on 1 October 1997, having been appointed in November of the previous year. He held this position until his retirement on 30 September 2006.

Post-UN political activities 
Goulding was one of 52 former British diplomats who, in 2004, signed a letter criticising British policy in the Middle East. While the government discounted the criticisms raised in the letter, Goulding suggested that the opinions expressed therein were also held by current employees of the Foreign Office.

He had also, on a separate occasion, called for the withdrawal of American military forces from Iraq and the transfer of authority over security operations to a UN-sanctioned multinational force from Arab and Muslim countries.

Publications 
Goulding was the author of Peacemonger (2003), an account of the inner workings of the United Nations and its activities during his tenure.
He has also published articles in various academic journals, including African Affairs
and International Affairs.

Goulding was a recipient of the Duke of Westminster's Medal for Military Literature, awarded by the Royal United Services Institute for authorship of books that make "a notable and original contribution to the study of international and national security and defence".

See also 
 History of the United Nations
 List of United Nations peacekeeping missions
 Timeline of United Nations peacekeeping missions

References

Further reading 
 

1936 births
2010 deaths
Ambassadors of the United Kingdom to Angola
Ambassadors of the United Kingdom to São Tomé and Príncipe
People educated at St Paul's School, London
People from Plymouth, Devon
British officials of the United Nations
Knights Commander of the Order of St Michael and St George
Alumni of Magdalen College, Oxford
Wardens of St Antony's College, Oxford
Members of HM Diplomatic Service
20th-century British diplomats